Derrick Low (born March 21, 1986) is an American professional basketball player who last played for Pieno žvaigždės of the Lietuvos krepšinio lyga.

Professional career
After college, Low was not selected at the 2008 NBA draft.

In July 2008, he signed with the Sydney Spirit of Australia's National Basketball League. On January 5, 2009, he left Sydney and signed with the French club SPO Rouen Basket for the rest of the season.

On September 4, 2009, he signed a one-year contract with the Lithuanian club Šiauliai.

On July 20, 2010, he signed a one-year contract with the Israeli club Maccabi Haifa.

On September 24, 2011, he signed a one-year contract with the Ukrainian club BC Dnipro. On May 16, 2015, he re-signed with Dnipro for one more season.

On June 16, 2013, he signed a one-year deal with the Ukrainian club Azovmash. On December 26, 2013, he parted ways with Azovmash. On January 3, 2014, he signed with Selçuk Üniversitesi BK of Turkey for the rest of the season.

On July 12, 2015, Low signed with the Romanian club Timișoara. However, he left Timișoara before appearing in a game for them. On December 9, 2015, he signed with the Lithuanian club Pieno žvaigždės for the rest of the season. On August 16, 2016, he re-signed with Pieno žvaigždės for one more season. In April 2017 Low failed doping test, taken by Lithuanian Anti-Doping Agency. Low admitted taking the substances and disqualification of 20 months was assigned by FIBA.

References

External links
 Eurobasket.com profile
 FIBA.com profile
 Washington State bio

1986 births
Living people
American expatriate basketball people in Australia
American expatriate basketball people in France
American expatriate basketball people in Israel
American expatriate basketball people in Lithuania
American expatriate basketball people in Turkey
American expatriate basketball people in Ukraine
American men's basketball players
American sportspeople in doping cases
Basketball players at the 2007 Pan American Games
Basketball players from Hawaii
BC Azovmash players
BC Dnipro players
BC Pieno žvaigždės players
BC Šiauliai players
Doping cases in basketball
Maccabi Haifa B.C. players
Point guards
Sportspeople from Honolulu
Torku Konyaspor B.K. players
Washington State Cougars men's basketball players
West Sydney Razorbacks players
Pan American Games competitors for the United States